Perfect Life is the debut studio album of Levinhurst, released in 2004.

Reception

Jo-Ann Greene of Allmusic gave Perfect Life 4 out of 5 stars, calling it "a highly coherent selection of electro numbers that range from clubby dance songs to more ambient soundscapes, some instrumental, others given added atmospheres by Cindy Levinson's dreamy vocals."

Track listing
"Vinti" (1:13)
"Let's Go" (3:39)
"Sorrow" (3:30)
"Sadman" (5:41)
"Lost" (4:13)
"Insomniac" (1:33)
"Despair" (3:47)
"Hope" (3:03)
"Behind Me" (4:09)
"Perfect Life" (1:30)
"More/Mad" (7:05)

Personnel
Cindy Levinson - vocals
Lol Tolhurst - keyboards, drums, synthesizer
Dayton Borders - guitar, keyboard

References

2004 debut albums
Levinhurst albums